Gôtovany is a village and municipality in Liptovský Mikuláš District in the Žilina Region of northern Slovakia.

History
In historical records the village was first mentioned in 1355.

Geography
The municipality lies at an altitude of 595 metres and covers an area of 2.914 km². It has a population of about 389 people.

Genealogical resources

The records for genealogical research are available at the state archive "Statny Archiv in Bytca, Slovakia"

 Roman Catholic church records (births/marriages/deaths): 1725-1896 (parish B)

See also
 List of municipalities and towns in Slovakia

External links
http://www.statistics.sk/mosmis/eng/run.html 
Surnames of living people in Gotovany

Villages and municipalities in Liptovský Mikuláš District